During the 2001–02 English football season, Crewe Alexandra competed in the Football League First Division, their 79th in the English Football League.

Season summary
A disappointing season for Crewe resulted in relegation after five seasons in the second tier of English football. Despite relegation, there was a momentous occasion where Crewe boss Gradi celebrated his 1,000th game in charge of Crewe on 20 November 2001 – an away fixture at Carrow Road, the home of Norwich City.

Final league table

Results
Crewe Alexandra's score comes first

Legend

Football League First Division

FA Cup

League Cup

Squad

Left club during season

References

Crewe Alexandra
Crewe Alexandra F.C. seasons